was a Japanese poet noted for haiku. He had an interest in the haikai tradition of pre-modern times. He won the Yomiuri Prize for poetry in 1977.

References 

Recipients of the Order of the Rising Sun
Kyushu University alumni
People from Nagasaki
1919 births
2010 deaths
20th-century Japanese poets